Witch is the third EP by South Korean boy band Boyfriend. It was released physically October 13, 2014.

Background and promotion 
On May 27, 2013, Starship Entertainment revealed Boyfriend would release a digital single, "On & On", the next day.  On May 28, the single was released and its music video uploaded to Starship's official YouTube channel,

On September 26, 2014, Starship Entertainment released the track list for Boyfriend's third EP. No other details, such as the concept or title track, were confirmed by Starship Entertainment. The album name and release date were revealed October 1, and on October 13, Starship Entertainment posted the music video teaser for another single, "White Out".

Boyfriend debuted the EP's songs on Mnet's M!Countdown on October 9.  On October 13, physical copies of the EP Witch were released.  The official music video for the EP's title track, "Witch", was also released that same day.

Track listing

Release history

References 

2014 EPs
Boyfriend (band) EPs
Starship Entertainment EPs
Kakao M EPs